Aviation Historical Park is an outdoor aviation museum just inside the main gate of Naval Air Station Oceana in Virginia Beach, Virginia.  It is open for visitors on a tour of the base, which is operated by the Military Aviation Museum, and military and DOD employees. Aircraft on display represent those historically in use at the air station.

Aircraft in the collection include:

 Douglas XAD-1 (Skyraider)	
 Douglas A-4F (Skyhawk)
 Grumman KA-6D (Intruder)
 Douglas F4D-1 (Skyray)
 Grumman F11F-1 (Tiger)
 Grumman F9F-2 (Panther)
 McDonnell F2H-4 (Banshee)
 North American FJ-3 (Fury)
 Grumman F-14A (Tomcat)
 McDonnell-Douglas F-4B (Phantom II)
 McDonnell-Douglas FA-18A (Hornet)
 Vought F-8E (Crusader)

See also
 List of aerospace museums

References

External links
 Military Aviation Museum official site

Aerospace museums in Virginia
Museums in Virginia Beach, Virginia